Novenky is a rural locality (a khutor) in Alexandrovskoye Rural Settlement, Talovsky District, Voronezh Oblast, Russia. The population was 364 as of 2010. There are 3 streets.

Geography 
Novenky is located 8 km northeast of Talovaya (the district's administrative centre) by road. Svetly is the nearest rural locality.

References 

Rural localities in Talovsky District